The Coolidge Unified School District #21 serves Coolidge, Arizona and outlying areas. It has six schools: Heartland Ranch and West elementary schools; Coolidge Junior High School; Coolidge Alternative Program (CAP); Coolidge Virtual Academy (CVA); and Coolidge High School.

References

External links
 

School districts in Pinal County, Arizona